Diego Campos (born 1 October 1995) is a Costa Rican professional footballer who will play for Degerfors IF in Allsvenskan, the top tier of Swedish football.

Career 
Campos played four years of college soccer at Clemson University. During his time with the Tigers, Campos scored 23 goals and tallied 22 assists in 81 appearances.

Campos also appeared for USL PDL side SIMA Águilas in 2017.

Chicago Fire 
On January 19, 2018, Campos was selected with the 38th overall pick of the 2018 MLS SuperDraft by the Chicago Fire. Campos signed with the club on February 28, 2018.

Campos made his professional debut on March 31, 2018, as a half-time substitute during a 2–2 draw with Portland Timbers.

FK Jerv 
He signed for FK Jerv for the 2020-2021 season on a free transfer from Chicago Fire.

Degerfors IF 
Since the 2022 season, Diego Campos plays for Degerfors IF in Allsvenskan. He signed on a three year deal and he's the first player from Costa Rica to ever play for Degerfors IF

References

External links 

1995 births
Living people
Association football forwards
Chicago Fire FC draft picks
Chicago Fire FC players
Clemson Tigers men's soccer players
Costa Rican expatriate footballers
Costa Rican footballers
Indy Eleven players
Major League Soccer players
SIMA Águilas players
Sportspeople from Lake County, Florida
Footballers from San José, Costa Rica
USL League Two players
FK Jerv players
Costa Rican expatriate sportspeople in Norway
Expatriate footballers in Norway
Norwegian First Division players